Yaadgar is a 1984 Indian Hindi-language film directed by Dasari Narayana Rao, starring Kamal Haasan, Poonam Dhillon and Sanjeev Kumar. The film featured lyrics penned by Indivar and Anjaan, music by Bappi Lahiri.

Plot
Rajnath "Raju" is a liar; he used to lie to everyone in his village for money. One day a fire erupted in a function in a village, his father was badly injured, he tried to convince the doctor and other villagers to come and help him save his father, but due to his lying habits no one believed him, Eventually, his father died due to lack of medical care. The next day he ends up at his sister's home who was married, his in-laws let him stay in the house in return for helping in household chores, but he ends up as full-time servant and he gets rotten food to eat. One day, when his in-law has an accident, he holds him responsible for being very unlucky for him and the whole family. The next day when he is sent to buy groceries, he saves a blind women from thugs and he ends up losing all the groceries. When he goes home, he gets insulted by his own sister because she does not believe his story and thinks that he must have spent the money for himself. Later, he is given a task to repair a family clock which he accidentally breaks; to buy a replica of the clock, he takes part in a race to earn some money. He wins the race and buys the clock, but when he returns home he is beaten by his in-laws because his sister's husband had lost his job and he again blames him for being so unlucky. His sister cannot tolerate this and just asks her brother to go away and leave the house. He learns that the blind girl's mother is seriously ill so he brings a doctor, but it's too late and her mother died. The story shifts to Rai Sahib Kalpnath Rai, a superstitious rich man who was losing his everything in betting and gambling. One day he encounters Raju while going for a bet and he wins the bet for the very first time in his life. He brings him home as he finds him lucky, as he has no kids, he adopts Raju after various profitable deals. Raju marries the blind girl and gives her treatment at a hospital for her eyesight, she gets her eyesight back and Kalpnath eventually becomes a father. Everything was going well until Raju gets cancer due to eating rotten food for such a long time at his in-laws house. Later, he is blamed for poisoning his new-born brother for inheritance, but when his mother learns that he is already suffering from cancer, she is sorry. Later, her own brother is guilty and then Raju dies in his parents' arms.

Cast 

 Sanjeev Kumar as Rai Sahib Kalpnath Rai
 Kamal Haasan as Rajnath "Raju"
 Poonam Dhillon as Naina "Naini"
 Tanuja as Malti
 Sujit Kumar as Suresh
 Vijay Arora as Dr. Bhatnagar  
 Jamuna as Laxmi Rai
 Raza Murad as Balwant   
 Dina Pathak as Suresh's mother 
 Purnima as Parvati "Paro"  
 Bhagwan Dada as Bhagwan 
 Mohan Choti as Rajnath's friend  
 Dinesh Hingoo as Rajnath's friend
 Rajendranath as Chhotelal 
 Yunus Parvez as Munim Govardhan
 Raj Kishore as Chatur Singh

Soundtrack

The music was composed by Bappi Lahiri. Bangladeshi playback singer Runa Laila sang in this film sountrack.

References

External links

1984 films
Indian drama films
1980s Hindi-language films
Films directed by Dasari Narayana Rao
Films scored by Bappi Lahiri
Remakes of Indian films
1984 drama films
Hindi-language drama films